A veterinary specialist is a veterinarian who specializes in a clinical field of veterinary medicine.

A veterinary specialist may be consulted when an animal's condition requires specialized care above and beyond that which a regular veterinarian can offer. Many veterinary specialists require a referral in order to be seen. After treatment, a veterinary specialist may stay in close contact with the referring veterinarian to provide ongoing treatment suggestions and advice. Veterinary specialists also play an important role in the training and continuing education of veterinary students, nursing staff, and practicing veterinarians. Though variable, specialists may earn up to 2–3 times more than general practice veterinarians.

Admission or entry into a veterinary specialty residency program is highly competitive in the United States and Canada. Most specialties require a 1-year internship or 2 years of clinical practice prior to beginning a residency of 3–4 years' duration. Some veterinarians complete additional specialty internships before being accepted into a residency program. In the United States, most internships and residencies accept applicants through the Veterinary Internship & Residency Matching Program, similar to the National Resident Matching Program for physicians. Most specialties require the resident to produce some academic contribution (often in the form of a scientific publication) in order to qualify to sit the certifying examination. Many specialists are active researchers in their fields of expertise.

Specialties

Anesthesiology and pain management
Anatomic pathology
Animal behavior
Animal welfare
Aquatic animal medicine
Avian medicine
Bovine medicine
Canine medicine
Cardiology
Clinical pathology
Clinical pharmacology
Dentistry
Dermatology
Diagnostic imaging
Equine
Emergency and critical care
Honey bee medicine
Feline medicine
Veterinary immunology
Internal medicine
Laboratory animal medicine
Microbiology
Neurology and neurosurgery
Nutrition
Oncology (cancer in animals)
Ophthalmology
Parasitology
Porcine medicine
Poultry medicine
Preventive medicine
Radiation oncology
Reptile and amphibian medicine
Shelter medicine
Sports medicine and rehabilitation
Surgery, including orthopaedics and soft tissue surgery
Theriogenology
Toxicology
Zoological medicine

American Veterinary Medical Association
According to the AVMA, a board-certified veterinary specialist is "a veterinarian who has completed additional training in a specific area of veterinary medicine and has passed an examination that evaluates their knowledge and skills in that specialty area." , the AVMA recorded 13,539 total active board-certified specialists.

, the AVMA recognizes 41 distinct veterinary specialties from 22 veterinary specialty organizations, including the American College of Veterinary Anesthesia and Analgesia, American College of Veterinary Surgeons, and American College of Zoological Medicine.

European Board of Veterinary Specialization
The European Board of Veterinary Specialization recognizes the following 23 veterinary specialty organizations:
European College of Zoological Medicine
European College of Animal Reproduction
European College of Bovine Health Management
European College of Equine Internal Medicine
European College of Laboratory Animal Medicine
European College of Porcine Health Management
European College of Poultry Veterinary Medicine
European College of Small Ruminant Health Management
European College of Veterinary Anaesthesia and Analgesia
European College of Animal Welfare and Behavioural Medicine
European College of Veterinary Comparative Nutrition
European College of Veterinary Clinical Pathology
European College of Veterinary Dermatology
European College of Veterinary Diagnostic Imaging
European College of Veterinary Internal Medicine - Companion Animals
European College of Veterinary Neurology
European College of Veterinary Ophthalmologists
European College of Veterinary Pathology
European College of Veterinary Public Health
European College of Veterinary Pharmacology and Toxicology
European College of Veterinary Surgeons
European Veterinary Dentistry College
European Veterinary Parasitology College

International Board of Veterinary Specialisation and other boards
International Veterinary Forensic Sciences Association
Vet Food Agro Diagnostics
Honey Bee Veterinary Consortium
Pig Veterinarian Society

See also
Medical specialist

References

External links
American Veterinary Medical Association
European Board of Veterinary Specialisation

Veterinary professions